Byju's (stylised as BYJU'S) is an Indian multinational educational technology company, headquartered in Bangalore, Karnataka, India. It was founded in 2011 by Byju Raveendran and Divya Gokulnath. , Byju's is valued at  billion and the company claims to have over 115 million registered students.

History 
	

Byju's app was developed by Think and Learn Pvt. Ltd, a company which was established by Byju Raveendran, Divya Gokulnath and a group of students in 2011. Byju, an engineer by profession was coaching students in mathematics since 2006. In initial days the company focused on offering online video-based learning programs for the K-12 segment and for competitive exams. In 2012, the firm entered Deloitte Technology Fast 50 India and Deloitte Technology Fast 500 Asia Pacific ratings and has been present there ever since.

In August 2015,  the firm launched Byju's: The Learning App. In 2017, they launched Byju's Math App for kids and Byju's Parent Connect app. By 2018, it had 15 million users out of which 900,000 were paid users at that time. In the same year, Byju's became India’s first edtech unicorn. By 2019, 60% of BYJU’S students were from non-metros and rural cities.

In January 2022, the company joined Simplilearn, Unacademy, upGrad, PrepInsta Prime and Vedantu to become one of the founding members of IAMAI's India EdTech Consortium. 

In March 2022, it signed a contract with Qatar Investment Authority to establish a new edtech company and a R&D centre in Doha.

In August 2022, Bloomberg News reported that the Ministry of Corporate Affairs sent a letter to Byju's asking them to explain the non-filing of its audited financials for the year ending March 2021. Having missed the deadline by over 17 months, Byju's reasoned the delay was due to the challenge of consolidating the accounts of its acquisitions during that year. In spite of the delay, Deloitte gave the company a clean audit. In November 2022, many employees of Byju's came out to speak against the company's unfair treatment. Reportedly, Byju's sacked over 5,000 employees.

Products and services 
Byju's is an education tutoring app that runs on a freemium model, with free access to content limited for 15 days after the registration. It was launched in August 2015, offering educational content for students from classes 4 to 12 and in 2019 an early learning program has started for classes 1 to 3. It also trains students for examinations in India such as IIT-JEE, NEET, CAT, IAS, and international examinations such as GRE and GMAT.

Academic subjects and concepts are explained with 12-20 minute digital animation videos and through which students learn in a self-paced mode. Byju's reports to have 40 million users overall, 3 million annual paid subscribers and an annual retention rate of about 85%. In October 2018, the app expanded to the United Kingdom, United States and other English-speaking countries.

In 2019, the company announced that it would launch its app in regional Indian languages. It also planned to launch an international version of the app for English-speaking students in other countries.  And to cater students of kindergarten, Byju's launched new programs in its Early Learn App. 

In April 2021, the company also announced the launch of "Byju's Future School" to be led by WhiteHat Jr Founder Karan Bajaj. The Future School aims to cross the bridge from passive to active learning with an interactive learning platform blended with coding and other subjects like Math, Science, English, Music and Fine arts through storytelling. Byju's will launch the Future School in the United States, United Kingdom, Australia, Brazil, Indonesia and Mexico in May. Karan Bajaj quit WhitHat Jr a year after the acquisition.

The company is focusing on adopting a hybrid model of teaching and learning by launching 500 tuition centers across 200 cities in India. As of February 2022, 80 centers are already launched.

Acquisitions 
In July 2017, Think and Learn acquired TutorVista (including Edurite) from Pearson. In September 2020, Byju's acquires virtual labs simulation startup LabInApp. In February 2021, Byju's acquires Mumbai-based doubt clearing platform Scholr.

In April 2021, Byju's acquired test prep firm Aakash Educational Services Ltd. in an estimated  cash and stock deal. Aakash's founders and Blackstone Group will receive minority stakes in Byju's as part of the deal. In July 2021, Byju's acquired American-based kids learning platform Epic! in a  cash-and-stock deal. In December 2021, Byju’s acquired GeoGebra in a  cash-and-stock deal.

Till date, Byju's invested at least $2.8 billion on a dozen acquisitions in an apparent attempt to expand beyond the original learning app and thread together its services that will allow it to reach learners of all ages. For example, it has ventured into exam preparation, higher education MOOCs, and tuition centers. In addition, it has acquired several additional platforms that offer virtual reality, artificial intelligence, and educational gaming services, most of which occurred in 2021.

Funding and financials 
Byju's received seed funding from Aarin Capital in 2013. As of 2019, Byju's had secured nearly $785 million in funding from investors, including Sequoia Capital India, Chan Zuckerberg Initiative (CZI), Tencent, Sofina, Lightspeed Venture Partners, Qatar Investment Authority, Verlinvest, IFC, Napsters Ventures, CPPIB and General Atlantic. Byju's was the first company in Asia to receive an investment from Chan-Zuckerberg Initiative (co-funded by Meta Platforms co founder, chairman and CEO Mark Zuckerberg and Priscilla Chan). As per the company filings with the Ministry of Corporate Affairs, Byju's became a unicorn and was valued at ₹6,505 crore ($1 billion) as of March 2018. In June 2020, Byju's attained the decacorn status with an investment by Mary Meeker's Bond Capital. In March 2022 Byju's raised $800 million, reaching a valuation of $22 billion.

In September 2020, Byju's replaced Oppo as the title sponsor of the India national cricket team. Byju's operates roughly on a premium business model where a paid subscription is required for most of the content. In 2017, Byju's generated revenues of about ₹260 crore (US$40 million or €33 million) and doubled it in 2018 financial year, earning ₹520 crore. In June 2020, with the investment of Bond, a global technology investment firm, Byju's became decacorn at US$10.5 billion valuations.

In November 2020, Byju's became the title sponsor of the Indian Super League club Kerala Blasters FC replacing Muthoot Group. In November 2020, Byju's raised US$200 million in a fresh funding round led by BlackRock and T. Rowe Price at a valuation of $12 billion. In March 2021, Byju's secured $460m in a series F funding round. In April 2021, B Capital, Baron Funds, and XN invested $1 billion in Byju's. In June 2021, Byju's raised $50 million in a Series F round from IIFL's private equity fund and Maitri Edtech. In October 2021, Byju's raised $296 million as a part of its Series F round from Oxshott Venture Fund, Edelweiss Group, Verition Fund, XN Exponent Holdings, and MarketX Ventures. In March 2022, the company raised $800 million from Byju Raveendran, Sumeru Ventures, Vitruvian Partners, and BlackRock.
In March 2022, Byju's was named as one of the official sponsors of the 2022 FIFA World Cup.

Philanthropy 
In September 2020, Byju's launched the “Education for All” Initiative for kids from marginalized populations.

Among the several initiatives launched under Education for All, Byju's Give was launched in November 2020, under which the company collects old or unused smart devices for refurbishing purposes and then loads them up with Byju's content for free and distribute to those children who have no access to the internet.

Sports sponsorships 
In July 2019, Byju's won the sponsorship rights for the Indian cricket team jersey.

In November 2020, Byju's replaced the Muthoot Group to become the title sponsor of the Indian Super League club Kerala Blasters FC.

In March 2022, Byju's was announced as an official sponsor of the FIFA  World Cup Qatar 2022.

Criticism

Libel suits 
Byju's was criticized for charging fees that only the rich can afford. Former salespeople say the company pushes its products on parents who cannot afford them. Byju's filed a  crore defamation suit against critic Pradeep Poonia. They later withdrew the lawsuit.

Advertising and sales practices 
Byju's subsidiary WhiteHat Jr. was asked to remove their five TV advertisements by the Advertising Standards Council of India (ASCI) due to misleading advertisements and hard sales tactics. WhiteHat Jr. claimed that a child named "Wolf Gupta" bagged job offers worth crores in multiple social media advertisements. This child was often described to be between the ages of 6 to 14 years. Investigations later revealed that this was all fabricated and Mr."Gupta" is a work of fiction.

The company had filed a  defamation suit against Pradeep Punia in November 2020, a software engineer, who alleged that the company made false claims and hired incompetent teachers. It was later withdrawn. It has also been the subject of a data leak, where the personal information of over 200,000 users was exposed. 

The Department of Consumer Affairs voiced concerns on June 24, 2022, at India Edtech Consortium (IEC) meeting regarding aggressive sales practices and deceptive marketing strategies utilized by EdTech companies, particularly Byju's and the entities that make up its group. DCA advised Byju's to work closely with the ASCI based on the complaints against it. According to the reports, Byju's team has pledged to resolve these grievances with a detailed action plan.

Accounting practices 
Previously, BYJU's used a different revenue recognition practice, which they had to change and obtain approval in accordance with Indian Accounting Standards (Ind-AS) 115 guidelines. For example, revenue expected in one fiscal year for a multi-year charge cannot be considered as revenue in that year alone. This discrepancy was eventually flagged by the auditor and a change was sought by the latter. As of September 2022, BYJU's began recognising streaming revenue across the term of usage, which was previously recognised fully upon the start of the contract. These new accounting standards have resulted in a reduction in the amount of income that Byju's is able to book in advance.

Also, in the past, BYJU's used its funding capital to acquire both domestic and overseas businesses and group them under its brand. And, lately investors voiced scepticism regarding this very plan to rapidly deploy capital in order to grow internationally.

Awards and nominations

See also 
 Course Hero
 Doubtnut
 Khan Academy
 Vedantu

References

External links
 

Byju's
Indian educational websites
Educational websites
Educational technology companies
Education companies of India
Indian companies established in 2011
2011 establishments in Karnataka
Online K–12 schools
Internet properties established in 2011
Online tutoring
IOS software
Virtual learning environments
Distance education institutions based in India
Multinational companies headquartered in India